The Peter Harrison Planetarium is a 120-seat digital laser planetarium, situated in Greenwich Park, London and is part of the National Maritime Museum. It opened on 25 May 2007.

The planetarium uses Digistar 3 software with blue, red and green lasers and grating light valve (GLV) technology to create a 4,000 pixel strip. This strip is swept to produce a 5,000 by 4,000 pixel image, refreshed 60 times per second. The image is projected through a fisheye lens onto the dome of the planetarium.

This planetarium is housed inside a 45-ton bronze-clad truncated cone, with the north side tilted at 51.5o to the horizontal (the latitude of Greenwich), the south side pointing at the local Zenith (i.e. at 90 degrees to the local horizon) and the top being slanted to be parallel to the celestial equator. The construction stands parallel to (but 50 metres east of) the prime meridian. It was conceived under the then Director, Roy Clare CBE, as the centrepiece of the "Time and Space" project, a £17.7m re-development of the Royal Observatory, Greenwich, and funded with a £3.25m grant from the Peter Harrison Foundation.

See also
London Planetarium

References

External links

Planetarium shows, Royal Museums Greenwich

Planetaria in the United Kingdom
Buildings and structures in the Royal Borough of Greenwich
Tourist attractions in the Royal Borough of Greenwich
Royal Observatory, Greenwich